The giant grouper (Epinephelus lanceolatus), also known as the Queensland grouper, brindle grouper or mottled-brown sea bass, is a species of marine ray-finned fish, a grouper from the subfamily Epinephelinae which is part of the family Serranidae, which also includes the anthias and sea basses. It has a wide Indo-Pacific distribution and is one of the largest extant species of bony fish.

Description

The giant grouper has a robust body which has a standard length equivalent to 2.4 to 3.4 times its depth. The dorsal profile of the head and the intraorbital area are convex, The propercle has a rounded corner and a finely serrated margin. The gill cover has a convex upper margin. There are 11 spines and 14–16 soft rays in the dorsal fin while the anal fin has 3 spines and 8 soft rays. The caudal fin is slightly rounded. There are 54 to 62 scales in its lateral line. The adults are grayish-brown in colour overlain with a mottled pattern and with darker fins. The small juveniles are yellow with wide, dark irregular bars and irregular dark spots on their fins.

Distribution
The giant grouper has a wide Indo-Pacific distribution, it is the most widely distributed species of grouper in the world. It occurs from the Red Sea and the eastern coasts of Africa as far south as Algoa Bay in South Africa and across the Indian Ocean into the Western Pacific Ocean as far east as the Pitcairn Islands and Hawaii. They occur as far north as southern Japan and as far south as Australia. In Australia it is found from Rottnest Island in Western Australia north and east along the tropical coasts of Australia, including offshore reefs, and then south along the eastern coast to Woy Woy, New South Wales. It also occurs around Christmas Island and Cocos (Keeling) Islands and the Elizabeth and Middleton Reefs Marine National Park Reserve in the Tasman Sea. There have also been reports from the Younghusband Peninsula in South Australia and north eastern New Zealand. It is absent from the Persian Gulf but it is present off the coast of Pakistan and southern Oman. It has been listed as a potential invasive species in the Bahamas but its presence in that region requires verification.

Habitat and biology
It is associated with reefs and is the largest known bony fish found on reefs. Large specimens have been caught from shore and in harbours. They are found in caves and in wrecks while the secretive juveniles occur in reefs and are infrequently observed. The adults are mainly solitary and hold territories on the outer reef and in lagoons. They have also been caught in turbid water over silt or mud sea beds by prawn fishermen. The giant grouper is an opportunistic ambush predator which feeds on a variety of fishes, as well as small sharks, juvenile sea turtles, crustaceans and molluscs which are all swallowed whole. Fish which inhabit coral reefs and rocky areas favour spiny lobsters as prey; a  specimen taken off Maui in Hawaii had a stomach content of two spiny lobsters and a number of crabs. Fish living in estuarine environments in South Africa were found to be feeding almost exclusively on the crab Scylla serrata. This species is normally solitary and long-lived. They are, however,  curious and frequently approach divers closely. They are not generally considered dangerous to humans but divers are advised to treat large specimens with caution and not to hand feed them.

Reproduction
Like most groupers, giant groupers are protogynous hermaphrodites. They spawn on a lunar cycle, with spawns lasting about 7 days. They are aggregative broadcast spawners, usually with several females per male. Studies in captive populations suggest that the dominant male and female begin the spawning event as nearly the only spawners for the first day or two, but other members of the aggregation fertilize more eggs as the event progresses, with even the most recently turned males fathering offspring. Giant groupers are diandric protogynous hermaphrodites, meaning that although some males develop from reproductively functional females other males start to produce sperm without ever having gone through a phase as a reproductive female.

Taxonomy
The giant grouper was first formally described as Holocentras lanceolatus in 1790 by the German medical doctor and naturalist Marcus Elieser Bloch (1723–1799) with the type locality given as the East Indies. Felipe Poey assigned the giant and goliath groupers (Epinephelus itajara and E. quinquefasciatus, which was then regarded as a synonym of E. itajara) to the genus Promicrops but in 1972 this was designated as a subgenus of Epinephelus. However, these species are still each other's closest relatives.

Utilisation
The giant grouper is a highly valued food fish and is taken by both commercial and recreational fisheries. As well as the consumption of its flesh its skin, gall bladder and stomach are used in Traditional Chinese Medicine. It is valued in Hong Kong as a live fish for the live reef food fish trade, especially smaller specimens. This species is cultured in mariculture and this practice is widespread but there is a restricted supply of juveniles, although hatcheries in Taiwan have produced captive bred juveniles, exporting some for to be grown on in other parts of South-East Asia. Many of the fish produced in aquaculture are hybrids between this species and E. fuscoguttatus.

Cultural references
The first fish to undergo chemotherapy was Bubba, a giant grouper at the Shedd Aquarium in Chicago.

References

External links
 Epinephelus lanceolatus on the Integrated Taxonomic Information System
 Queensland Groper, Epinephelus lanceolatus from the Australian Museum
 

giant grouper
Fish of the Indian Ocean
Fish of the Pacific Ocean
Fish of Hawaii
giant grouper